The winners of the Second Annual Latin Grammy Awards were announced during a press conference on Tuesday, October 30, 2001 at the Conga Room in Los Angeles, California. The conference, which was broadcast live on the internet, was hosted by Jimmy Smits and Paul Rodriguez. Alejandro Sanz was the big winner winning four awards including Album of the Year. Juanes won three awards including Best New Artist.

Cancellation
Prior to the date of the event, the Latin Grammys were moved from Miami to Los Angeles due to protests by Cuban exiles for allowing musicians living in Cuba to perform. The awards were to have been presented at the Shrine Auditorium in Los Angeles CA with a CBS national telecast on Tuesday, September 11, 2001. It was to be hosted by Jimmy Smits and Christina Aguilera. The telecast was cancelled because of the terrorist attacks that morning in New York City, Washington, D.C., and Shanksville, Pennsylvania. After many discussions about rescheduling the ceremony, The Latin Recording Academy determined it would be impossible to do so. Instead, the winners were announced at a press conference on October 30 at the Conga Room. The cancellation of the event cost the organizers an estimate of $2 million in losses.

Awards

General
Record of the Year
Alejandro Sanz — "El Alma Al Aire"
 Christina Aguilera — "Pero Me Acuerdo de Ti"
 Aterciopelados — "El Álbum"
 Gilberto Gil — "Esperando Na Janela"
 Juanes — "Fijate Bien"

Album of the Year
Alejandro Sanz — El Alma Al Aire
 Vicente Amigo — Ciudad de las Ideas
 Gilberto Gil — As Canções de Eu Tu Eles
 Juanes — Fíjate Bien
 Paulina Rubio — Paulina

Song of the Year
Alejandro Sanz — "El Alma Al Aire"
 Alejandro Lerner — "Amarte Así"
 Francisco Céspedes — "Dónde Está La Vida"
 Juanes — "Fijate Bien"
 Estéfano — "Y Yo Sigo Aquí" (Paulina Rubio)

Best New Artist
Juanes
 Bacilos
 Bebel Gilberto
 Sindicato Argentino del Hip Hop
 Manuel Vargas

Pop
Best Female Pop Vocal Album
Christina Aguilera — Mi Reflejo
 Natalia Oreiro — Tu Veneno
 Laura Pausini — Entre tú y mil mares
 Paulina Rubio — Paulina
 Thalía — Arrasando

Best Male Pop Vocal Album
Alejandro Sanz — El Alma Al Aire
 Pedro Guerra — Ofrenda
 Alejandro Lerner — Si Quieres Saber Quien Soy
 Luis Miguel — Vivo
 Antonio Vega — De Un Lugar Perdido

Best Pop Album by a Duo/Group with Vocals
Armando Manzanero — Duetos
 Bacilos — Bacilos
 Ella Baila Sola — Marta y Marilia
 Ana Torroja and Miguel Bosé — Girados en Concierto
 Chucho Valdés and Irakere — Unforgettable Boleros

Best Pop Instrumental Album
Nestor Torres — This Side of Paradise
 Andrés Alén — Pianoforte
 Lara & Reyes — World Jazz
 Keith Lockhart conducting The Boston Pops Orchestra — The Latin Album
 Marcus Viana — Terra

Rap/Hip-Hop
Best Rap/Hip-Hop Album
Sindicato Argentino del Hip Hop — Un Paso a la Eternidad
 DJ Kun — Crazy Atorrante
 Faces do Subúrbio — Como É Triste de Olhar
 Planet Hemp — A Invasão do Sagaz Homem Fumaça
 7 Notas 7 Colores — La Mami Internacional Presenta: 7 Notas 7 Colores

Rock
Best Rock Solo Vocal Album
Juanes — Fíjate Bien
 Fito Páez — Rey Sol
 Rosendo Mercado — Canciones para Normales y Mero Dementes
 Cecilia Toussaint — Cecilia Toussaint
 Julieta Venegas — Bueninvento

Best Rock Album by a Duo/Group with Vocals
Aterciopelados — Gozo Poderoso
 Jarabe de Palo — De Vuelta y Vuelta
 Los Amigos Invisibles — Arepa 3000
 Los Rabanes — Rabanes
 Super Ratones — Mancha Registrada

Best Rock Song
Juanes — "Fijate Bien"
 Jarabe de Palo — "De Vuelta y Vuelta"
 Aterciopelados — "El Álbum"
 Fito Páez — "El Diablo de tu Corazón"
 Julieta Venegas — "Hoy No Quiero"

Tropical
Best Salsa Album
Tito Puente and Eddie Palmieri — Obra Maestra
 Issac Delgado — La Fórmula/Malecón
 Oscar D'León and Wladimir — Doble Play
 Grupo Niche — Propuesta
 Tito Rojas — Rompiendo Noches
 Gilberto Santa Rosa — Intenso

Best Merengue Album
Chichí Peralta — ...De Vuelta al Barrio
 Grupo Manía — Grupomania 2050
 Eddy Herrera — Me Enamore
 Manny Manuel — En Vivo!
 Toño Rosario — Yo Soy Toño

Best Traditional Tropical Album
Celia Cruz — Siempre Viviré
 Celina González and Reutilio — 50 Años...Como Una Reina
 Los Super Seven — Canto
 Plena Libre — Mas Libre
 Omara Portuondo — Buena Vista Social Club Presents Omara Portuondo

Best Tropical Song
Kike Santander — "Júrame (Merengue)" (Gisselle)
 Albita — "Azúca' Pa' Tu Amargura"
 Issac Delgado — "La Fórmula"
 Toño Rosario — "Yo Me Muero Por Ella"
 Alejandro Jaén and William Paz — "Yo Si Me Enamoré" (Huey Dunbar)

Regional
Best Ranchero Album
Pedro Fernández — Yo No Fuí
 Myrza — Homenaje a Fernando Z. Maldonado
 Paquita la del Barrio — Piérdeme el Respeto
 Mariachi Sol De México — Tequila con Limón con el Mariachi
  Manuel Vargas — Por Amor

Best Banda Album
Banda el Recodo — Contigo Por Siempre
 Banda Arkángel R-15 — Reina de Reinas
 Banda Limonense — Por Una Mujer Bonita
 Banda Machos — Mi Guitarra y Yo
 Carmen Jara — Arráncame la Vida

Best Grupero Album
Grupo Limite — Por Encima De Todo
 Caballo Dorado — No Dejes De Bailar
 Guardianes Del Amor — Un Millón De Lágrimas
 La Mafia — Contigo
 Mojado — Los Ángeles También Bailan

Best Tejano Album
Jimmy González & El Grupo Mazz — Quien Iba A Pensar
 Emilio — El Rey Del Rodeo
 David Lee Garza & Los Musicales — 20/20
 Los Palominos — Obsesión
 A.B. Quintanilla & Los Kumbia Kings — Shhh!

Best Norteño Album
Ramón Ayala y Sus Bravos Del Norte — Quémame Los Ojos/Amigos Del Alma
 Grupo Atrapado — Atrapando Tú Corazón
 Los Tigres del Norte — De Paisano A Paisano
 Los Tucanes De Tijuana — Me Gusta Vivir De Noche
 Polo Urías y Su Máquina Norteña — De Chihuahua Para Ti

Best Regional Song
Jose Vaca Flores — "Borracho Te Recuerdo" (Vicente Fernández)
 Enrique Valencia — "De Paisano A Paisano" (Los Tigres del Norte)
 Francisco de Jesus Martínez — "Disculpe Usted" (Los Humildes)
 Oscar Treviño — "Mi Obsesión" (Los Palominos)
 Toscano — "Piérdeme El Respeto" (Paquita la del Barrio)

Traditional
Best Folk Album
El All-Stars de La Rumba Cubana — La Rumba Soy Yo
 Jaime Uribe Espita, José Revelo and John Villegas — Seresta
 Hevia — The Other Side
 Carlos Núñez — Mayo Longo
 Lázaro Ros — Yamayá

Best Tango Album
Carlos Franzetti — Tango Fatal
 Leopoldo Federico & Orquesta — De Antología
 Rodolfo Mederos and Nicolás Brizuela — Tangos
 Nuevo Quinteto Real — Tangos
 Salgan y de Lio — En Vivo en el Club del Vino

Best Flamenco Album
Vicente Amigo — Ciudad de las Ideas
 Montse Cortés — Alabanza
 Mayte Martín — Querencia
 José Mercé — Aire
 Estrella Morente — Mi Cante y un Poema
 Navajita Plateá — Hablando en Plata

Jazz
Best Latin Jazz Album
Paquito D'Rivera Quintet — Live at the Blue Note
 Chico O'Farrill — Carambola
 Danilo Pérez — Motherland
 David Sánchez — Melaza
 Chucho Valdés — Solo: Live in New York
 Various Artists — Calle 54

Brazilian
Best Brazilian Contemporary Pop Album
Marisa Monte — Memorias, Crônicas e Declarações de Amor
 Zeca Baleiro — Líricas
 Pedro Mariano — Voz no Ouvido
 Ivete Sangalo — Beat Beleza
 Herbert Vianna — O Som do Sim

Best Brazilian Rock Album
Rita Lee — 3001
 Charlie Brown Jr. — Nadando com os Tubarões
 Cidade Negra — Enquanto o Mundo Gira
 Pavilhão 9 — Reação
 Sidereal — Na Paz

Best Samba/Pagode Album
Zeca Pagodinho — Agua da Minha Sede
 Beth Carvalho — Pagode de Mesa 2 - Ao Vivo
 Harmonia do Samba — O Rodo
 Jair Rodrigues — 500 Anos de Folia - Volume 2
 Various Artists — Casa de Samba 4

Best MPB Album
Caetano Veloso — Noites do Norte
 Bebel Gilberto — Tanto Tempo
 Guinga — Suíte Leopoldina
 Ney Matogrosso — Batuque
 Emílio Santiago — Bossa Nova

Best Sertaneja Music Album
Pena Branca — Semente Caipira
 Bruno & Marrone — Acústico
 Leonardo — Quero Colo
 Roberta Miranda — Histórias de Amor
 Sérgio Reis — Sérgio Reis
 Rionegro & Solimões — Bate o Pé ao Vivo

Best Brazilian Roots/Regional Album
Gilberto Gil — As Canções de Eu Tu Eles
 Dominguinhos — Ao Vivo
 Forróçacana — Vamo Que Vamo
 Zé Ramalho — Nação Nordestina
 Alceu Valença — Forró Lunar

Best Brazilian Song
Raimundinho do Accordion, Targino Gondim and Manuca — "Esperando na Janela" (Gilberto Gil)
 Herbert Vianna — "A Lua Q Eu T Dei" (Ivete Sangalo)
 Carlinhos Brown and Marisa Monte — "Amor I Love You" (Marisa Monte)
 Caetano Veloso — "Sou Seu Sabiá"
 Caetano Veloso — "Zera a Reza"

Children's
Best Latin Children's Album
Miliki — Cómo Estan Ustedes?
 Los Niños de Cuba — Así Cantan Los Niños de Cuba
 Niños Adorando — Niños Adorando
 El Morro — Puras Para Niños, Vol. 1
 Colegio de Música de Medellín — Traralalala

Classic
Best Classical Album
Carlos Alvarez, Plácido Domingo, Jane Henschel and Ana Maria Martinez — Albeniz: Merlin
 Plácido Domingo and Ana Maria Martinez — Bacalov: Misa Tango
 Benjamin Echenique — México Barroco/Puebla VIII - Maitines para Nuestra Señora de Guadalupe/Manuel Arenzana
 Eduardo Diazmuñoz and Roberto Limon — Tango Mata Danzón Mata Tango
 Alberto Cruzprieto, Mercedes Gomez, Roberto Kolb and Jaime Marquez — Toussaint: Gauguin

Production
Best Engineered Album
Marcelo Anez, Gustavo Celis, Gordon Chinn, Charles Dye, Javier Garza, Mike Gouzauski, Sebastian Krys, Freddy Pinero, Jr., Eric Schilling, Joel Someilan, Ron Taylor, J. C. Ulloa and Robb Williams — Arrasando (Thalía)
 Luca Bignardi, Steve Churchyard, David Cole, Rupert Coulson, Jon Jacobs, Luis Quiñe, Ben "Jammin" Robbins and Ali Thomson — Entre tú y mil mares (Laura Pausini)
 Duda, Marcelo Loud, Sergio Ricardo and Luiz Paulo Serafim — Gil y Milton (Gilberto Gil and Milton Nascimento)
 Juan Ignacio Cuadrado and Fredy Marugan — Los Paraísos Desiertos (Ismael Serrano)
 Moogie Canazio and Marcelo Sabóia — Noites do Norte (Caetano Veloso)

Producer of the Year
K. C. Porter
 Alfredo Cerruti and Laura Pausini
 Rildo Hora
 Phil Ramone
 Gustavo Santaolalla

Music Video
Best Music Video
Ricky Martin — "She Bangs"
 Juanes — "Fijate Bien"
 La Oreja de Van Gogh — "Paris"
 Os Paralamas do Sucesso — "Aonde Quer Que Eu Va"
 Fito Páez — "El Diablo En Tu Corazón"
 Alejandro Sanz — "Cuando Nadie Me Ve"

See also
List of entertainment affected by the September 11 attacks

References

2001 music awards
Latin Grammy Awards by year
Impact of the September 11 attacks on television
Cancelled events in the United States
2001 in Latin music
2001 in Los Angeles
October 2001 events in the United States